is a major railway station in the Shinjuku and Shibuya wards in Tokyo, Japan. In Shinjuku, it is part of the Nishi-Shinjuku and Shinjuku districts. In Shibuya, it is located in the Yoyogi and Sendagaya districts. It is the world's busiest railway station.

Serving as the main connecting hub for rail traffic between Tokyo's special wards and Western Tokyo on the inter-city rail, commuter rail, and subway lines, the station was used by an average of 3.59 million people per day in 2018, making it, by far, the world's busiest station (and registered as such with Guinness World Records). The main JR station and the directly adjacent private railways have a total of 35 platforms, including an underground arcade, above-ground arcade and numerous hallways with another 17 platforms (53 total) that can be accessed through hallways to 5 directly connected stations without surfacing outside. The entire above/underground complex has well over 200 exits.

Lines
Shinjuku is served by the following railway systems:
:
 Chūō Main Line (Limited Express)
 Chūō Line (Rapid)
 Chūō–Sōbu Line
 Saikyō Line
 Shōnan–Shinjuku Line
 Yamanote Line
 Keio Corporation:
 Keio Line
 Keio New Line
 Odakyu Electric Railway:
 Odakyu Odawara Line
:
 
 
:

Station facilities

JR East

The station is centered around facilities servicing the East Japan Railway Company (JR East) lines. These consist of eight ground-level island platforms (16 tracks) on a north-south axis, connected by two overhead and two underground concourses. Most JR services here are urban and suburban mass transit lines, although many limited express services to Kōfu and Matsumoto on the Chūō Main Line and to Nikkō and Kinugawa Onsen via joint operations with the private Tōbu Railway also begin and end at this station, including Narita Express services to and from Narita International Airport. The JR section alone handles an average of 1.5 million passengers a day.

Odakyu

The terminus for the private Odakyu Odawara Line is parallel to the JR platforms on the west side and handles an average of 490,000 passengers daily. This is a major commuter route stretching southwest through the suburbs and out towards the coastal city of Odawara and the mountains of Hakone. The ten platforms are built on two levels beneath the Odakyu department store; three express service tracks (six platforms) on the ground level and two tracks (four platforms) on the level below. Each track has platforms on both sides in order to completely separate boarding and alighting passengers.

Chest-high platform screen doors were added to platforms 4 and 5 in September 2012.

Ground level

Underground level

Keio/Toei Subway (Toei Shinjuku Line)

Keio operates two sections of Shinjuku Station, the traditional Keio Line stub terminal and a separate through station connecting the Keio New Line with the Toei Shinjuku Line. In 2019, 788,567 passengers used the Keio complex daily (Keio and Keio New Lines), which makes it among the busiest among the non-JR Group railways of Japan.

Keio Line 
The Keio Line concourse is located to the west of the Odakyu line concourse, two floors below ground level under the Keio department store. It consists of three platforms stretching north to south. An additional thin platform between Platforms 2 and 3 is used for alighting only. This suburban commuter line links Shinjuku to the city of Hachiōji to the west. Chest-high platform edge doors were introduced on the Keio Line platforms in March 2014. The doors are different colours for each platform; the doors on Platform 2 are green.

Keio New Line and Toei Shinjuku Line
The shared facilities for the Toei Shinjuku subway line and the Keiō New Line are distinctively called  and consist of two platforms stretching east-west five floors beneath the Kōshū Kaidō avenue to the southwest of the JR section. The concourse is managed by Keio Corporation but is in a separate location from the main Keio platforms. Further south (and deeper underground) are the two north-to-south Toei Ōedo subway line platforms.

Toei Subway (Toei Oedo Line)

Toei Ōedo Line's two underground platforms stretch north-south to the south of the Toei Shinjuku Line and Keio New Line facilities. This is on the 7th basement floor of Tokyo prefectural road 414(Yotsuya-Tsunohazu Ave.).

Tokyo Metro

Tokyo Metro's two Marunouchi Line underground platforms stretch east-west to the north of the JR and Odakyu facilities, directly below the Metro Promenade underground mall.

Commercial facilities

Many department stores and shopping malls are built directly into the station. These include
Lumine Est – above JR's east exit
Odakyu department store – above the Odakyu line concourse
Odakyu Mylord – above the southern end of the Odakyu line concourse
Lumine 1 shopping mall – above the Keio Line concourse
Lumine 2 shopping mall – above JR's south and Lumine exits
Keio Department store – above the Keio Line concourse
Keio Mall – underground mall to the southwest of the Keio Line concourse
Odakyu Ace – underground malls beneath the bus terminal by the west exit.

In addition to the above, the Metro Promenade, which is an underground mall owned by Tokyo Metro, extends eastwards from the station beneath Shinjuku-dori avenue, all the way to the adjacent Shinjuku-sanchōme station with 60 exits along the way. The Metro Promenade in turn connects to Shinjuku Subnade, another underground shopping mall, which leads onto Seibu Railway's Seibu-Shinjuku station.

Shinjuku Station is connected by underground passageways and shopping malls to
Nishi-Shinjuku Station (Tokyo Metro Marunouchi Line)
Seibu Shinjuku Station (Seibu Shinjuku Line)
Shinjuku-nishiguchi Station (Toei Ōedo Line)
Shinjuku-sanchōme Station (Tokyo Metro Marunouchi Line, Tokyo Metro Fukutoshin Line, and Toei Shinjuku Line)
Tochōmae Station (Toei Ōedo Line)

Nearby non-connected stations (within 500 meters of an underground passageway or station) include
Shinjuku-gyoemmae Station
Yoyogi station
Higashi-Shinjuku Station
Okubo Station
Shin-Okubo Station
Minami-Shinjuku Station

Bus terminals
There is a bus terminal at the west exit servicing both local and long-distance buses and a JR Highway Bus terminal at the New South Gates.

On April 4, 2016, the new bus terminal and commercial facilities nearby the south exit, named  (Shinjuku Expressway Bus Terminal), opened for service. Considerable numbers of coaches and airport buses depart from this new terminal.

Passenger statistics
The figures below are the official number of passengers entering and exiting (except for JR East) each day released by each train operator. The figure for JR East only includes entering passengers.

Average number of passengers per day by fiscal year for the JR East station (1913 - 1935)

Average number of passengers per day by fiscal year for the JR East station (1953 - 2000)

Average number of passengers per day by fiscal year for the JR East station (2001 onwards)

History 

Shinjuku Station opened in 1885 as a stop on Japan Railway's Akabane-Shinagawa line (now part of the Yamanote Line). Shinjuku was still a quiet community at the time and the station was not heavily trafficked at first. The opening of the Chūō Line (1889), Keiō Line (1915) and Odakyū Line (1923) led to increased traffic through the station.

Japanese government urban planner Kensaburo Kondo designed a major revamp of the station in 1933, which included a large public square on the west side completed in 1941. Kondo's plan also called for extending the Tokyu Toyoko Line to a new underground terminal on the west side of the station and constructing an east-west underground line that would be served by the Seibu Railway and the Tokyo Kosoku Railway (forerunner of Tokyo Metro), while the Keio and Odakyu lines would use above-ground terminals to the west of the JR station. These plans were suspended upon the onset of World War II but influenced the current layout of the station area. Subway service ultimately began in 1959.

The Seibu Shinjuku Line was extended from Takadanobaba Station to Seibu Shinjuku Station in 1952. Seibu Shinjuku was built as a temporary station pending a planned redevelopment of the east side of Shinjuku Station, which was to feature a large station building that would house a new Seibu terminal on its second floor. Seibu abandoned its plan to use the building due to a lack of space for trains longer than six cars; the building is now known as Lumine Est and retains some design features originally intended to accommodate the Seibu terminal (in particular, a very high ceiling on the first floor and a very low ceiling on the second floor). In the late 1980s, Seibu planned to build an underground terminal on the east side of Shinjuku but indefinitely postponed the plan in 1995 due to costs and declining passenger growth.

On 8 August 1967, a freight train carrying jet fuel bound for the U.S. air bases at Tachikawa and Yokota collided with another freight train and caught fire on the Chūō Rapid tracks. The incident stoked ongoing political controversy in Japan regarding the Vietnam War. The station was a major site for student protests in 1968 and 1969, the height of civil unrest in postwar Japan. On 21 October 1968, 290,000 marchers participated in International Anti-War Day, taking over Shinjuku station and forcing trains to stop. In May and June 1969, members of the antiwar group Beheiren carrying guitars and calling themselves "folk guerrillas" led weekly singalongs in the underground plaza outside the west exit of the station, attracting crowds of thousands. Participants described it as a "liberated zone" and a "community of encounter." In July, riot police cleared the plaza with tear gas and changed signs in the station to read "West Exit Concourse" instead of "West Exit Plaza." The incident represented a significant defeat for public activism in Tokyo.

There have been plans at various points in history to connect Shinjuku to the Shinkansen network, and the 1973 Shinkansen Basic Plan, still in force, specifies that the station should be the southern terminus of the Jōetsu Shinkansen line to Niigata. While construction of the Ōmiya-Shinjuku link never started and the Jōetsu line presently terminates in Tokyo Station, the right of way, including an area underneath the station, remains reserved.

On 5 May 1995, the Aum Shinrikyo doomsday cult attempted a chemical terrorist attack by setting off a cyanide gas device in a toilet in the underground concourse, barely a month after the gas attack on the Tokyo subway which killed 13, left 6,252 people with non-fatal injuries, severely injured 50 people, and caused 984 cases of temporary vision problems. This time the attack was thwarted by staff who extinguished the burning device.

The station facilities on the Marunouchi Line were inherited by Tokyo Metro after the privatization of the Teito Rapid Transit Authority (TRTA) in 2004.

Station numbering was introduced to the Odakyu terminal in 2014 with Shinjuku being assigned station number OH01.

A major expansion of the JR terminal was completed in April 2016, adding a 32-story office tower, bus terminal, taxi terminal, and numerous shops and restaurants.

Station numbering was introduced to the JR East platforms in 2016 with Shinjuku being assigned station numbers JB10 for the Chūō-Sobu line, JS20 for the Shonan-Shinjuku line, JA11 for the Saikyō line, JC05 for the Chuo line rapid, and JY17 for the Yamanote line. At the same time, JR East assigned the station a 3-letter code to its major transfer stations; Shinjuku was assigned the code "SJK".

In 2020, the east-west free passageway was opened, shortening the time required for pedestrians to pass between the east and west exits by 10 minutes. A major redevelopment of the station and the surrounding area began in July 2021 with the aim of improving pedestrian flow and making it easier and faster to cut through the east and west sides of the station. Construction is expected to continue until 2047.

Keiō Shinjuku Station

When the Keio Line extended to Shinjuku in 1915, its terminal was located several blocks east of the government railway (presently JR) station. The terminal was first named  and was on the street near the Isetan department store. In 1927, the station was moved from the street to a newly built terminal adjacent to the original station. The station building housed a department store.

The tracks from the terminal were on the Kōshū Kaidō highway, which crosses the Yamanote Line and the Chūō Line in front of the south entrance of Shinjuku Station by a bridge. The Keiō Line had a station for access to Shinjuku Station, named  and renamed in 1937 .

In July 1945, the terminal of the Keiō Line was relocated to the present location, though on the ground level, on the west side of Shinjuku Station. Keiō Shinjuku Station and Shōsen Shinjuku Ekimae Station were closed. This was because the trains faced difficulty in climbing up the slopes of the bridge over the governmental railway after one of the nearby transformer substations was destroyed by an air raid. The site of Keiō Shinjuku Station near Shinjuku-Sanchōme subway station is now occupied by two buildings owned by Keiō: Keiō Shinjuku Sanchōme Building and Keiō Shinjuku Oiwake Building.

Cultural references 
The station and other parts of the Toei Ōedo Line are referenced in the Digimon Adventure franchise. Contemporary British painter Carl Randall (who spent ten years living in Tokyo as an artist) depicted the station area in his large oil painting 'Shinjuku', exhibited at the National Portrait Gallery in London in 2013.

See also

List of East Japan Railway Company stations
List of railway stations in Japan
Transport in Greater Tokyo
Gare du Nord, the busiest railway station outside Japan

References

External links

JR map of Shinjuku Station
map of Odakyu Shinjuku Station
Shinjuku station map from Keio
map of Toei Subway Shinjuku Station 
map of Tokyo Metro Shinjuku Station 

Yamanote Line
Saikyō Line
Shōnan-Shinjuku Line
Chūō Main Line
Chūō-Sōbu Line
Odakyu Odawara Line
Keio Line
Keio New Line
Toei Shinjuku Line
Toei Ōedo Line
Tokyo Metro Marunouchi Line
Stations of East Japan Railway Company
Stations of Odakyu Electric Railway
Stations of Keio Corporation
Stations of Tokyo Metropolitan Bureau of Transportation
Stations of Tokyo Metro
Railway stations in Tokyo
Railway stations in Japan opened in 1885